Antônio Moreira César (July 9, 1850 – March 4, 1897) was a Brazilian army officer who fought on the side of the government forces in the Navy Revolt, the Federalist Revolution and the War of Canudos. He was governor of the state of Santa Catarina in 1894, where he ordered inummerous summary executions and murders, particularly the Baron of Batovi, a decorated hero of the Paraguayan War. Moreira César was killed in action fighting against the rebels of Antônio Conselheiro during the War of Canudos.

Biography
César was born in the state of São Paulo to Antônio Moreira César de Almeida (1814–1860) and his wife Francisca Correia de Toledo (1818–1895).

Revolta da Armada (1893–1894)

Federalist Revolution (1893–1895)

War of Canudos (1896–1897)

After a defeat at the hands of the Canudos rebels, the Brazilian Army sent César to lead a large expeditionary force against them consisting of three infantry battalions, one cavalry and one artillery battalion, which were all newly armed and trained. Despite the new knowledge gained about the size and resolve of the rebels, it was thought impossible that they could resist such a strong regular army force. However, the Canudos rebels defeated César's column after only two days of fighting, resulting in another great loss of life and military material among the Brazilian forces, as well as the death of César himself.

1850 births
1897 deaths
People from Pindamonhangaba
Governors of Santa Catarina (state)